Mervyn Charles Probine  (30 April 1924 – 17 April 2010) was a New Zealand physicist and public servant. He served as chairman of the State Services Commission between 1981 and 1986.

Early life and family
Born in Auckland on 30 April 1924, Probine was the son of Frederick Charles Probine and Annie Kathleen Probine (née Polson). He married Marjorie Walker in 1949, and the couple went on to have two children.

Career
Probine joined the Department of Scientific and Industrial Research (DSIR) as a draughtsman in 1942. He graduated with a Bachelor of Science from Auckland University College in 1947 and a Master of Science from 1951 from Victoria University College, and obtained a PhD in physics from the University of Leeds. In 1967, he was appointed director of the Physics and Engineering Laboratory (PEL), and then ten years later, was promoted to assistant director-general of the DSIR.

Probine joined the State Services Commission in 1979, and was appointed chair of that body in 1981. During his tenure, the Official Information Act 1982 was passed and the Equal Employment Opportunities Unit (EEOU) was established. The EEOU was charged with promoting and monitoring access to employment opportunities in the New Zealand public service for ethnic minorities, women, and the disabled.

Honours and awards
In 1964, Probine was elected a Fellow of the Royal Society of New Zealand. In the 1986 New Year Honours, he was appointed a Companion of the Order of the Bath, in recognition of his service as chairman of the State Services Commission.

Death
Probine died in Auckland on 17 April 2010.

References

Notable New Zealanders (1979, Paul Hamblyn, Auckland)

1924 births
2010 deaths
New Zealand public servants
New Zealand Companions of the Order of the Bath
People from Auckland
Alumni of the University of Leeds
New Zealand physicists
People associated with Department of Scientific and Industrial Research (New Zealand)
Fellows of the Royal Society of New Zealand